Graham Raymond Brookhouse (born 19 June 1962) is a former British Olympic modern pentathlete.

Seoul Olympics 
Brookhouse competed in the 1988 Summer Olympics in Seoul, South Korea and won a bronze medal in the team event with a total point tally of 15276.

Barcelona Olympics 
Brookhouse also competed in the 1992 Summer Olympics held in Barcelona, Spain. He once again competed in the modern pentathlon where he came 8th in the individual event and he also came 6th in the team event. He was one of the oldest competitors in the Modern Pentathlon competition at the age of 30 in 1992.

Gloucester City Swimming Club 
He also runs his own swim school in Stroud.

References

1962 births
Living people
Olympic modern pentathletes of Great Britain
Olympic bronze medallists for Great Britain
Olympic medalists in modern pentathlon
Modern pentathletes at the 1988 Summer Olympics
Modern pentathletes at the 1992 Summer Olympics
British male modern pentathletes
English male swimmers
Sportspeople from Birmingham, West Midlands
Medalists at the 1988 Summer Olympics